WLPP-LP (102.9 FM) is an American low-power FM radio station licensed by the Federal Communications Commission (FCC) to serve the community of Palenville, New York on the frequency of 102.9 megahertz. The station license is assigned to Maetreum of Cybele, Magna Mater Inc. WLPP-LP airs a community radio format.

The FCC first licensed this station to begin operations on July 27, 2015, using callsign WLPP-LP; the call sign had been assigned on February 4, 2014.

References

External links
 Official WLPP-LP Website  
 

LPP-LP
LPP-LP
Radio stations established in 2015
2015 establishments in New York (state)
Community radio stations in the United States